Leyanet González Calero (born 30 September 1978) is a Cuban former artistic gymnast who competed in the 2004 Summer Olympics. She is one of only five female gymnasts to return to international competition after having a child, along with Larisa Latynina, Oksana Chusovitina, Suzanne Harmes, and Aliya Mustafina.

At the 2004 Olympics, at the age of 25, González finished 22nd in the all-around.

González is now retired from gymnastics and lives in Cancún, Mexico.

Eponymous skill
González has one eponymous skill listed in the Code of Points.

Notes

References

External links
 
 
 

1978 births
Living people
Cuban female artistic gymnasts
Olympic gymnasts of Cuba
Gymnasts at the 2004 Summer Olympics
Gymnasts at the 1991 Pan American Games
Gymnasts at the 1995 Pan American Games
Gymnasts at the 2003 Pan American Games
Pan American Games gold medalists for Cuba
Pan American Games silver medalists for Cuba
Pan American Games bronze medalists for Cuba
Pan American Games medalists in gymnastics
Universiade medalists in gymnastics
Universiade silver medalists for Cuba
Universiade bronze medalists for Cuba
Medalists at the 1997 Summer Universiade
Medalists at the 1991 Pan American Games
Medalists at the 1995 Pan American Games
People from Sancti Spíritus
20th-century Cuban women
20th-century Cuban people
21st-century Cuban women